The Serbian Home is a two-story brick building, that was built in 1924 in South Saint Paul in the U.S. state of Minnesota. It was built as a community center for Serbian immigrants who worked in the meatpacking industry. It served as a museum respecting the multitude of ethnic groups who have made the city their home until 2020, when it was purchased and renovated by Serbian immigrant Aleksandar Stojmenovic to serve as an event center.

References

External links

Buildings and structures completed in 1924
Buildings and structures in Dakota County, Minnesota
Clubhouses on the National Register of Historic Places in Minnesota
Serbian-American history
National Register of Historic Places in Dakota County, Minnesota